Marc Brickman (born June 15, 1953, Philadelphia, Pennsylvania) is an American artist, director, producer, lighting designer and production designer. His visuals for Pink Floyd are iconic, and have reached audiences of millions world-wide. Often described as "groundbreaking", Marc's work includes productions for Paul McCartney, The Barcelona and Nagano Olympics Ceremonies, Cirque du Soleil (Viva Elvis), Blue Man Group, David Gilmour, Nine Inch Nails, John Mayer, Keith Urban, Barbra Streisand, Black Eyed Peas, Roger Waters, Whitney Houston, Slipknot, Bruce Springsteen, Yumi Matsutoya, Composer Hans Zimmer's Concert Series and Yusuf Islam, among hundreds of others.

Brickman’s artistry is never static and has helped to push the live entertainment industry, developing new technologies to meet the demands of newly-imagined creative design. In 1992, under Brickman’s direction, Jumbotron screens were moved live for the first time in Genesis’ We Can’t Dance tour.

In another of his many industry firsts, Marc found and implemented the world’s most powerful (at the time) gold-colored lasers, requiring FAA approval and spotters, for Pink Floyd’s Division Bell tour.

In 2012 Anthony Malkin, chairman, president and CEO of Empire State Realty Trust tapped Brickman to re-imagine the lighting of the Empire State Building.

Over the years, Marc’s work with The Empire State Building has transcended definition, as exemplified by his hybrid lighting art installation for the Whitney Museum of American Art and the Empire State Building in 2015. Brickman’s film of the event May 1, 2015 is on permanent exhibit at the Empire State Building’s Observatory Experience.

On July 4, 2015, Billboard reported that Brickman's lighting of the Empire State Building in New York was designed as a tribute to the Grateful Dead's Fare Thee Well shows at Soldier Field in Chicago and Independence Day, New York's iconic skyscraper turned red, white and blue, with a "swirl of the color spectrum" to approximate the band's tied-dyed aesthetic.

Brickman’s conceptual design for Eminem’s performance of Venom on the Empire State Building has garnered nearly 20 million views on the EminemMusic YouTube channel, as well as over 12 million views on Jimmy Kimmel Live’s YouTube channel. The filming of the video created a massive social media buzz.

During the pandemic, Brickman and his team at Tactical Manoeuvre designed and created a light-to-music show around the music of the Beatles. The concept was meant to unite the city of New York and to herald its first responders.

“People need a break, a chance to sing out loud and shake off the stress of the week. We encourage everyone at home, First Responders, and people around the world to look outside and have a moment of fun," said Anthony E. Malkin, Chairman and CEO of Empire State Realty Trust.

“In the United States, India, Australia, and China alone, the Empire State Building’s lights during the battle of the pandemic generated more than 33 billion impressions,” said Malkin. “The Empire State Building is the authentic representation of New York City and New York State to the world”.

Brickman made his Broadway debut in 2007 with Young Frankenstein. Marc co-directed and co-produced, Once Upon A Dream starring The Rascals, which completed a sold out Broadway run.

Film projects have included Steven Spielberg's Minority Report, A.I. Artificial Intelligence, Sam Raimi's Spider-Man, Running Man, and Cat in the Hat. Television credits include Let's Make a Deal, Live to Dance and Chris Botti's PBS Specials.

Arts commissions include a large-scale multimedia and digital installation at the Salzburger Festspiele. Marc's artist collective is Tactical Manoeuvre.

References

External links

 Marcbrickman.com/
 1988 Pink Floyd interview by M. Williams
 September 1994 Lighting Dimensions: Pink Floyd World Tour (US Leg)
 Marc Brickman's work on Waters Tour 
 

American production designers
1953 births
Living people
Central High School (Philadelphia) alumni